Lake Nerpichye (Nerpalaax) is a lake in the Sakha Republic of Russia. It is located in the Kolyma Lowland, south of lake Chukochye.

See also
List of lakes of Russia

References 

Lakes of the Sakha Republic
East Siberian Lowland